Gianni Meersman (born 5 December 1985) is a Belgian former professional track and road bicycle racer, who rode professionally between 2007 and 2016 for the , ,  and  teams. He currently works as a directeur sportif for the  team.

After stage 3 of the 2007 Tour de Georgia, Meersman was forced to abandon the race due to a severe case of patella tendinitis. He treated the riders of the Grand Peloton, a charity fundraiser ride, to his presence as the Peloton Captain of the "Blue Peloton". Meersman finally came to Grand Tour prominence, after 10 years as a professional racer, at the 2016 Vuelta a España winning two stages in bunch sprints. During the race,  announced that Meersman had agreed a one-year contract with the team for 2017.
However, a diagnosis of cardiac arrhythmia and scar tissue on his heart forced Meersman to announce his retirement on 30 December 2016. On 11 October 2017, Meersman was confirmed as the new sporting director for cyclo-cross team .

Major results

2002
 2nd Time trial, National Junior Road Championships
2004
 1st Circuit de Wallonie
 10th Grand Prix Criquielion
2005
 1st Stage 1 Ronde de l'Isard
 3rd Flèche Ardennaise
 7th Road race, UCI Under-23 Road World Championships
 8th Overall Le Triptyque des Monts et Châteaux
2006
 2nd Zellik–Galmaarden
 6th Overall Circuit des Ardennes
2007
 1st Stage 5 Tour of Austria
 1st Stage 3 Tour de Georgia
 7th Overall Tour of Belgium
 8th Overall Driedaagse van West-Vlaanderen
2008
 1st Stage 4 Tour de Wallonie
 2nd Overall Étoile de Bessèges
 3rd Trophée des Grimpeurs
 3rd Grand Prix de Plumelec-Morbihan
 6th Overall Four Days of Dunkirk
 9th Overall Circuit de Lorraine
2010
 2nd Overall Paris–Corrèze
2011
 1st  Overall Circuit des Ardennes
1st  Points classification
1st Stage 2
 2nd Road race, National Road Championships
 2nd Paris–Troyes
 2nd Route Adélie
 3rd Halle–Ingooigem
 4th Flèche d'Emeraude
 7th Overall Settimana Internazionale di Coppi e Bartali
 8th Brabantse Pijl
 10th Overall Ster ZLM Toer
2012
 1st Stage 4 Paris–Nice
 2nd Overall Tour de Wallonie
 3rd Clásica de San Sebastián
 10th Overall Volta ao Algarve
1st Stage 1
2013
 Volta a Catalunya
1st Stages 1 & 2
 Tour de Romandie
1st Stages 1 & 3
 1st Prologue Tour de l'Ain
 1st  Points classification, Critérium du Dauphiné
 2nd Road race, National Road Championships
 6th Les Boucles du Sud Ardèche
 6th Eschborn-Frankfurt City Loop
 7th Trofeo Platja de Muro
2014
 1st  Overall Tour de Wallonie
1st Points classification
1st Stage 5
 1st Trofeo Muro-Port d'Alcúdia
 Tour de l'Ain
1st Prologue & Stage 2
 3rd Overall Ster ZLM Toer
 3rd Trofeo Ses Salines
 3rd La Drôme Classic
 4th Overall Tour de Picardie
 4th Trofeo Palma
 6th Grand Prix Cycliste de Québec
 7th Grand Prix Impanis-Van Petegem
 9th Classic Sud-Ardèche
2015
 1st Cadel Evans Great Ocean Road Race
 1st Handzame Classic
 1st Stage 1 Volta ao Algarve
 2nd Le Samyn
 6th Down Under Classic
2016
 Vuelta a España
1st Stages 2 & 5
Held  after Stages 2 & 5–9
 2nd Overall Tour de Wallonie
 3rd Handzame Classic
 8th Münsterland Giro

Grand Tour general classification results timeline

References

External links

 
 
 Gianni Meersman's profile on Cycling Base 

1985 births
Living people
Belgian male cyclists
People from Tielt
Cyclists from West Flanders
Belgian Vuelta a España stage winners